Håvard Moen (born 11 January 1957) is a Norwegian former footballer. He played most of his career for Namsos, although he spent the 1983 and 1984 season playing for Rosenborg, where he played 30 matches. Moen was Rosenborg's top scorer in 1983 with eight goals. His Namsos career came to a halt in mid-1990, when he failed to show of for a league match and was suspended for the rest of the season.

References

1957 births
Living people
Norwegian footballers
Rosenborg BK players
Eliteserien players
Norwegian First Division players
People from Namsos
Association football midfielders
Sportspeople from Trøndelag